Bahram Mavaddat (born 30 January 1950) is a retired Iranian football player.

Club career
Mavaddat started his professional career for Shahin F.C. After playing for Paykan F.C., he changed to Persepolis F.C., where he won the Iranian championships in 1974 and in 1976 and reach the runner-up position in 1975.

In 1976, he changed to Sepahan F.C., where he played his two last seasons before retiring.

International career
He played for the Iran national football team and was the second choice Goal Keeper at the 1978 FIFA World Cup.

After retirement from football
Mavaddat joined to the People's Mujahedin of Iran, an opposition political party after the Iranian Revolution together with Hassan Nayebagha and now is one of the members of the National Council of Resistance of Iran.

References
Planet World Cup
RSSSF
Kayhan Publishing,Special Edition: 30 years of History of Persepolis Soccer Club: From Shahin til Piroozi.

1950 births
Living people
Iranian footballers
Persepolis F.C. players
1972 AFC Asian Cup players
1978 FIFA World Cup players
Iran international footballers
Asian Games gold medalists for Iran
Asian Games medalists in football
Association football goalkeepers
People's Mojahedin Organization of Iran members
Footballers at the 1974 Asian Games
Medalists at the 1974 Asian Games
20th-century Iranian people